Epiphyas pulla is a species of moth of the family Tortricidae. It is found in Australia, where it has been recorded from Western Australia.

The wingspan is about 16–22 mm.

References

Moths described in 1945
Epiphyas